Nikolayevka is a rural locality (a village) in Batyrovsky Selsoviet, Aurgazinsky District, Bashkortostan, Russia. The population was 25 as of 2010. There is 1 street.

Geography 
Nikolayevka is located 16 km east of Tolbazy (the district's administrative centre) by road. Knyazevka is the nearest rural locality.

References 

Rural localities in Aurgazinsky District